Marta Poláková (née Sedláčková; born 3 July 1934) is a Czech chess player, Czechoslovak Women's Chess Championship medalist (1965).

Biography
Marta Poláková was Brno chess player. She was one of the leading Czechoslovakian women's chess players from 1955 to 1966. Marta Poláková was four time finalist of the Czechoslovak Women's Chess Championship: 1956 (10th place), 1961 (shared 4th-5th place), 1965 (shared 2nd-3rd place), 1966 (7th place). She was designer by profession.

Marta Poláková played for Czechoslovakia in the Women's Chess Olympiad:
 In 1966, at first reserve board in the 3rd Chess Olympiad (women) in Oberhausen (+0, =1, -1).

References

1934 births
Living people
Czechoslovak female chess players
Czech female chess players
Chess Olympiad competitors
20th-century chess players